Lysithea  is a prograde irregular satellite of Jupiter. It was discovered by Seth Barnes Nicholson in 1938 at Mount Wilson Observatory and is named after the mythological Lysithea, daughter of Oceanus and one of Zeus' lovers.

It was sometimes called "Demeter" from 1955 to 1975.

It belongs to the Himalia group, moons orbiting between 11 and 13 Gm from Jupiter at an inclination of about 28.3°. Its orbital elements are as of January 2000. They are continuously changing due to solar and planetary perturbations. It is gray in color (B−V=0.72, V−R=0.36, V−I=0.74) and intermediate between C-type and P-type asteroids.

See also
Irregular satellites
Jupiter's moons in fiction

References

External links
Lysithea: Overview by NASA's Solar System Exploration
David Jewitt pages
Jupiter's Known Satellites (by Scott S. Sheppard)

Himalia group
Moons of Jupiter
Irregular satellites
19380706
Discoveries by Seth B. Nicholson
Moons with a prograde orbit